Elmer Claybourne (March 8, 1910 – January 7, 1960), was an American professional wrestler, better known by the ring name Jack Claybourne.

Professional wrestling career 
Claybourne began his wrestling career in 1931. 

On September 2, 1941, Claybourne won the Kentucky Negro Wrestling Championship from Hallie Samara in Louisville, KY. The following year he lost the title to King Kong Clayton. He won the Negro World Heavyweight and the Light Heavyweight Wrestling Titles in the United States. He was a recognized champion in Mexico, Australia, New Zealand, and Canada. Also he wrestled mainly in the National Wrestling Alliance's Toronto and Hawaii territories where he became a major star during the 1940s and 1950s.

Death 
On January 7, 1960, Claybourne committed suicide in Los Angeles, California.

Championships and accomplishments 
50th State Big Time Wrestling
Hawaii Heavyweight Championship (1 time)
Kentucky
Kentucky Negro Championship
Kentucky Negro Wrestling Championship  
World Negro Heavyweight Title
Negro Light Heavyweight Wrestling Titles
Maple Leaf Wrestling
NWA Canadian Open Tag Team Championship(1 time) - with Luther Lindsay
NWA British Empire Heavyweight Championship (Toronto version)(1 time)

See also 
 List of premature professional wrestling deaths

References

External links 
 

1910 births
1960 deaths
20th-century African-American sportspeople
20th-century professional wrestlers
American male professional wrestlers
African-American male professional wrestlers
People from Mexico, Missouri
Professional wrestlers from Missouri
NWA Canadian Open Tag Team Champions
NWA British Empire Heavyweight Champions (Toronto version)